Hingla is a gram panchayat under Mohammad Bazar (community development block) .It contains villages Chondrapur, Dewanganj, Korapukur, Sarenda, Hinglo, Palon, Nischintopur.

Demographics
Hingla gram panchayat is lying beside the river Dwarka River. It contains echo friendly villages with peaceful villagers. The village palan  is a milkman ( ghosh /ঘোষ) majority and "Borbore" is a tribal village. The village Chondrapur is famous for the Dwarbasini temple

References

Gram panchayats in West Bengal